Emma Vieceli is a British comic book artist and writer. After being a hobbyist at Sweatdrop Studios, she began freelancing professionally as an artist on SelfMadeHero's Manga Shakespeare: Hamlet adaptation in 2007. Her subsequent artist work includes Young Avengers (Marvel Comics, 2013), Back to the Future (IDW, 2017) and Doctor Who (Titan Comics, 2015). Vieceli started co-writing webcomic BREAKS with Malin Ryden in 2014 and was the writer for the Life Is Strange comic adaptation (Titan Comics, 2018).  Bleeding Cool described her as being "embedded into British comic books" and having a "forte" for writing teenage relationships in 2019.

Career
Vieceli joined Sweatdrop Studios as a hobbyist in 2002 and, through the group, released her own comic series 'Dragon Heir' as well as contributing to several anthologies. She described herself as a fan of the diversity and potential of comic storytelling, used her time with the group to encourage new creators, and to help in establishing competitions and events to serve as a platform for nurturing new talent and breaking down barriers between creators. In 2005, Vieceli and Sweatdrop Studios colleague Sonia Leong were approached by the organisers of the MCM London Comic Con, resulting in a showcase of independent and small press comic book creators and mainstream comics called Comic Village.

In 2007, she started freelancing as an comic artist on Self Made Hero's adaptation of Hamlet. She created Violet for The DFC and contributed words to Comic Book Tattoo in 2008. Several years later she stepped down from Sweatdrop to focus on her career. In 2011, Vieceli provided the art for the Vampire Academy graphic novel, based on the novels of the same name.

In 2014, Vieceli and Malin Ryden co-created webcomic  hosted on Tapas, described as an LGBT story, of which they publishes a new page every week. In 2017, Soaring Penguin Press published its first volume in print as well as making it available to view online. In November 2018, Vieceli was announced as the writer for the Life Is Strange comic adaptation by Titan Comics, set after the "Sacrifice Arcadia Bay" ending of the game and featuring art by Claudia Leonardi.

Outside comics 
Vieceli was a co-presenter of the Anime Network segment on the Propeller TV satellite channel in 2007. She performed in a South Pacific musical at the Cambridge Arts Theatre in 2013 and had a role in a musical adaptation of Little Women in 2019. In the television series Bates Motel, she provided the sketchbook found by Norman Bates in 2013. She provided art for tinyrebel’s Doctor Who Infinity games in 2019.

Works

Interior work 
 Hamlet (Manga Shakespeare Collection, Self Made Hero, 2007)
 Much Ado About Nothing (Manga Shakespeare Collection, Self Made Hero)
 Pink is for Girls (multiple artists)
 Sugardrops (multiple artists)
 Cold Sweat & Tears (multiple artists)
 Dragon Heir
 Draw Manga (multiple artists, New Holland)
 Digital Manga Techniques (Hayden Scott-Baron)
 Princess Ai: Rumors From the Other Side (multiple artists, Tokyopop)
 Comic Book Tattoo (multiple artists, Image Comics)
 My Little Pony, Tome 1: Joyeux anniversaire (Jungle)
 My Little Pony, Tome 2: L'histoire qui fait peur
 Tokyopop Rising Stars of Manga: UK & Ireland volume 1 (multiple artists; June 2008)
 500 Manga Characters by Sweatdrop Studios (Ilex, June 2007)
 How to Draw Fantasy Females by Chris Patmore (Barron's, March 2006)
 Telling Tales (multiple artists, Sweatdrop 2010)
 Tara Duncan, Tome 1 : La Sirène Muette (Jungle, 2010)
 Dragon Heir: Reborn (Sweatdrop, 2010)
 Vampire Academy (Razorbill, 2011)
 Vampire Academy: Frostbite (Razorbill, 2012)
 Vampire Academy: Shadow Kiss (Razorbill, 2013)
 Avalon Chronicles: Once in a Blue moon (Oni Press)
 Avalon Chronicles: The Girl and the Unicorn (Oni Press, June 2013, 
 Alex Rider: Scorpia (Walker Books, Feb 2016)
 Doctor Who: A Matter of Life and Death (Titan Comics, June 2016)
 Jem & the Holograms: Viral (IDW, May 2016)
 Adventures of Supergirl (DC, Sept, 2016)
 Back to the Future: Who is Marty McFly? (IDW, June 2017)
 Breaks Vol. 1 (Soaring Penguin Press, September 2017)
 Olivia Twist: Honor Among Thieves (Dark Horse Comics, April 2019)
 Life Is Strange Collection (Titan Comics, May 2019)
 Modern Frankenstein (Heavy Metal, September 2019)
 After the Ink Dries (Simon & Schuster, January 2021)

Cover work 
 eV (Cover Artwork)

References

Further reading 
 "Geek Syndicate, Episode 69". Interview with Vieceli

External links
 
 Grand Comics Database
 Vieceli on ComicSpace

1979 births
British comics artists
British female comics artists
Living people